Jamaican-American singer Shaggy has released seventeen studio albums, seven compilation albums, eighty-eight singles and forty-seven music videos. four He is best known for his hit singles "Oh Carolina", "Boombastic", "It Wasn't Me", and "Angel". In 2000, Shaggy released the album  Hot Shot, which was certified 6× Platinum in the United States. The album featured the singles "It Wasn't Me" and "Angel", the latter of which was built around two song samples – Merrilee Rush's 1968 hit "Angel of the Morning" (which was remade in 1981 by Juice Newton), and The Steve Miller Band's 1973 hit "The Joker". In 2001 Shaggy performed with Rayvon and Rikrok at Michael Jackson's 30th anniversary the songs "Angel" and "It Wasn't Me" from Hot Shot. The album hit number one on the US Billboard 200 and UK Albums Chart. As of 2007, Shaggy has sold over 20 million albums worldwide.

Albums

Studio albums

Compilation albums

Singles

As lead artist

As featured artist

Promotional singles

Guest appearances
 "Waste Time" with Cutty Ranks on the album Six Million Ways to Die in 1996.
 "Toro Toro" with Machel Montano on the album Charge in 1998.
 "Innosense" with Darwin's Waiting Room on the album Orphan in 2001.
 "Ghetto Child" with Joe" featuring Boys Choir of Harlem
 "Hot" with Play on the album Replay in 2003.
 "All Through the Night" with Cyndi Lauper on the album The Body Acoustic in 2005.
 "Rain" with Heather Headley on the album In My Mind in 2006.
 "Famous" with Ai on the album What's Goin' on Ai. in 2006.
 "The Way We Roll" with Elephant Man on the album Let's Get Physical in 2007.
 "Winning Season" with Machel Montano on the album Flame On in 2008.
 "I Wanna" with Bob Sinclar and Sahara on the album Made in Jamaica in 2010.
 "So Hot" with Honorebel on the album Club Scene in 2010.
 "Find Your Love" with Drake on the album Thank Me Later in 2010.
 "Sexy Swag" with Gabry Ponte in 2013.
 "Keep Cool" with Major Lazer on the album Free the Universe in 2013 (also features Wynter Gordon).
 "I Need Your Love" With Faydee, Costi, Mohombi in 2014 
 In 2015 he brought out the Spanglish Remix of the song "Piensas (Dile la verdad)" by Pitbull feat. Gente de Zona. The song was released on Spotify.
 "Black and White" with Kylie Minogue + Fernando Garibay on the album Kylie + Garibay in 2015.
 "Sunset" (With Farruko, Nicky Jam) in 2015.
 "Te Quiero Mas" (With Don Omar, Faydee, Costi, Farruko, Mohombi) in 2015.
 "Casual Love" with Jordin Sparks on the album "Right Here Right Now" in 2015.
 "City of Love (Martin's remix)" Mylène Farmer feat. Shaggy released as a single from Mylène Farmer's album Interstellaires in 2016.
 "Let Me Love You" (With Mohombi, DJ Rebel) in 2016.
 "Don't You Need Somebody" (Feat. RedOne, Friend) in 2016.
 "Don't Make Me Wait" (With Sting) in 2018.

References

Reggae discographies
Discographies of Jamaican artists